The second USS Volunteer (ID-3242) was a United States Navy collier in commission from 1918 to 1919.

Construction acquisition, and commissioning
SS Volunteer was built for the United States Shipping Board as a cargo ship by the Bethlehem Shipbuilding Corporation at Alameda, California, and launched on 18 May 1918. She was earmarked for U.S. Navy World War I service with the naval registry Identification Number (Id. No.) 3242, and was delivered to the Navy on 23 August 1918. She was commissioned as USS Volunteer the same day.

United States Navy service

Pressed into service as a collier, Volunteer departed San Francisco, California, on 7 September 1918, bound for East Asia. During that voyage, she made port calls at Shanghai, China, and Hong Kong before arriving at Manila on the island of Luzon in the Philippines on 24 October 1918. From there, she moved south to Iloilo on the island of Panay, located in the central Philippines. She reached Iloilo on 6 November 1918 and, after a false start and a return for additional fuel, finally set course back to the United States on 8 December 1918. Volunteer reached Oahu in the Hawaiian Islands on 1 January 1919 and remained in Hawaii until 9 January 1919, when she got underway for the United States East Coast. Volunteer arrived in New York City on 15 February 1919.

On 27 February 1919, Volunteer was simultaneously decommissioned, stricken from the Navy List, and returned to the United States Shipping Board.

Later career

Once again SS Volunteer, the ship remained in the possession of the United States Shipping Board until 1937, when she was sold to the Lykes Brothers-Ripley Steamship Company of New Orleans, Louisiana. That company operated her under the name SS Volunteer until either 1946 or 1948,<ref>According to the Naval History and Heritage Command Online Library of Selected Images (at http://www.history.navy.mil/photos/sh-civil/civsh-v/voluntr.htm), Lykes Brothers-Ripley Steamship Company sold Volunteer in 1946; according to the Dictionary of Naval Fighting Ships' and NavSource Online, that company sold her in 1948.</ref> then sold her to Arm. Transatlantica of Panama. Renamed SS Andalusia'', she continued in commercial service until she was wrecked on Waadah Island in the Strait of Juan de Fuca near Cape Flattery, Washington, on 4 November 1949.

Notes

References

Department of the Navy: Naval Historical Center: Online Library of Selected Images: Civilian Ships: Volunteer (American Freighter, 1918). Served as USS Volunteer (ID # 3242) in 1918-1919
NavSource Online: Civilian Vessel Photo Archive Volunteer (ID 3242)

 

Ships built in Alameda, California
1918 ships
World War I cargo ships of the United States
Colliers of the United States Navy